The Ray Twinney Complex, formerly known as the Newmarket Recreational Complex, is a multi-purpose recreational facility in the southwest portion of Newmarket, Ontario, built in 1985. The complex was named for former Newmarket mayor Ray Twinney.

The complex includes two ice pads, a swimming pool, which includes a wading pool and a hot tub, three conference rooms, one lighted outdoor multi-purpose sports field, two soccer pitches, and three baseball/softball diamonds.

The main arena has 3,700 seats. It is the current home of the Newmarket Saints of the Ontario Lacrosse Jr. B League, and has also been home to the Newmarket Hurricanes of the Ontario Provincial Junior A Hockey League, as well as the short-lived Newmarket Royals Ontario Hockey League team in the mid-1990s, and the Newmarket Saints AHL club.

External links
Ray Twinney Complex - The OHL Arena & Travel Guide

Indoor arenas in Ontario
Indoor ice hockey venues in Canada
Sports venues in Ontario
Ontario Hockey League arenas
Buildings and structures in Newmarket, Ontario
Sport in Newmarket, Ontario
Newmarket Saints